HU-336 is a strongly antiangiogenic compound, significantly inhibiting angiogenesis at concentrations as low as 300 nM. It inhibits angiogenesis by directly inducing apoptosis of vascular endothelial cells without changing the expression of pro- and antiangiogenic cytokines and their receptors. HU-336 is highly effective against tumor xenografts in nude mice. Although it is technically the oxidized quinone of delta-8 THC, it is entirely non psychoactive.

See also 
HU-331
HU-345

References 

Angiogenesis inhibitors
HU cannabinoids